Bangladesh Railway Government High School, founded in 1920, is one of the oldest secondary schools in Brahmanbaria District, Bangladesh. It offers first to tenth grades.

References

High schools in Bangladesh
Schools in Brahmanbaria District
Educational institutions established in 1920
1920 establishments in British India
Railway schools in Bangladesh